Ylva Cecilia Larsdotter Ljung (born 4 April 1961 in Uddevalla, Sweden) is a Swedish actress. She studied at Malmö Theatre Academy 1982–85.

Selected filmography

1989 - Tre kärlekar (TV)
1994 - Rederiet (TV)
1995 - Evil Ed
1997 - Pelle Svanslös (TV, Julkalendern)
1998 - The Last Contract
1999 - Vuxna människor
2000 - Pelle Svanslös och den stora skattjakten
2001 - Beck – Hämndens pris
2001 - A Song For Martin
2001 - En ängels tålamod (TV)
2003 - Hem till Midgård (TV)
2004 - The Ketchup Effect
2004 - Lilla Jönssonligan på kollo
2008 - Höök (TV)
2013 - Waltz for Monica

References

External links

Swedish Film Database

Swedish actresses
People from Uddevalla Municipality
1961 births
Living people